Scecina Memorial High School is a Roman Catholic co-educational high school located on the East Side of Indianapolis, Indiana. It is named in honor of Thomas Scecina, a priest from Indianapolis who was killed in action during the Second World War.

Athletics

The Scecina Memorial Crusaders are members of the Indiana Crossroads Conference. The school colors are cardinal red and gold.  The following IHSAA sanctioned sports are offered:

Baseball (boys')
Basketball (girls' and boys')
Cross country (girls' and boys')
Football (boys)
State champions - 1990, 1991
Golf (girls' and  boys')
Gymnastics (girls')
Soccer (girls' and boys')
Softball (girls')
State champions - 2007, 2013, 2017
Swimming (girls' and boys')
Tennis (girls'and boys')
Track (girls' and boys')
Volleyball (girls)
Wrestling (boys')

Notable alumni
 Michael Troy - swimming, 1960 Summer Olympics

See also
 List of high schools in Indiana

References

External links
 

Schools in Indianapolis
Educational institutions established in 1953
Catholic secondary schools in Indiana
Private high schools in Indiana
Roman Catholic Archdiocese of Indianapolis
Education in Marion County, Indiana
1953 establishments in Indiana